Natalia Saenz (born 28 October 1981) is an American-born Colombian model and television host. Saenz is most well known for her role as a Senadora on the weekly sports show República Deportiva on Univision.

Career
Saenz was born in Miami to Colombian parents, Miriam and Martha Walther Saenz. At the age of three, she moved with her family to Medellín, Colombia, where she would spend the rest of her childhood. At the age of fourteen, she began her career in the entertainment industry and often competed in beauty pageants. Four years later, she returned to her native Miami to further her career in show business. In 2003, Saenz was selected to participate in the contest for Miss República Deportiva, and was later hired by Univision to regularly appear on their popular show República Deportiva as a Senadora. From 2006 through 2015, she formed a longstanding duo on the program with the fellow Miami-born Colombian model Alba Galindo.

Personal life
Saenz was married to Venezuelan actor Melvin Cabrera, who is known for his role as the homosexual Ricardo de la Fuente on the Spanish-language telenovela Mystery-Suspense television series ¿Dónde está Elisa?. The relationship ended in divorce after two-and-a-half years in 2010.

Filmography

References

External links
Official website
 

1981 births
Living people
People from Miami
People from Medellín
Colombian female models
Colombian television presenters
Univision people
Colombian women television presenters